Wesley Joseph Nkong Fonguck (born 16 July 1997) is an English footballer who plays for Southend United.

Career
Fonguck played youth football for Crystal Palace before joining Combined Counties Football League side Croydon, for whom he made one league appearance.

Fonguck joined Barnet as a second-year scholar for the 2014–15 season, and made his senior debut on 16 December 2014, starting in an FA Trophy replay against Concord Rangers. He signed a one-year professional contract in June 2015. He joined Hendon on loan in November 2015, for whom he made 13 appearances. He made his Football League debut when he came on as a substitute against Crawley Town on the final day of the 2015–16 season. On 20 January 2017, he joined Hampton & Richmond Borough on loan. Fonguck left the Bees at the end of the 2018–19 season after turning down a new deal. He went on trial at Telstar in July 2019. Fonguck re-joined the Bees on a two-year deal on 6 September 2019. In December 2020, he was ruled out for the remainder of the 2020–21 season with an anterior cruciate ligament injury. On his departure from the club in July 2022, Fonguck had made 154 appearances for the Bees, scoring fifteen goals.

International career 
In September 2018, Fonguck was called up to the England C squad for their friendly the following month against Estonia U23. He would start for Paul Fairclough's side on his international debut and see out the full 90 minutes in a 1–0 win.

Career statistics

References

External links

1997 births
Living people
English footballers
England semi-pro international footballers
Association football midfielders
Crystal Palace F.C. players
Croydon F.C. players
Barnet F.C. players
Hendon F.C. players
Hampton & Richmond Borough F.C. players
Southend United F.C. players
English Football League players
National League (English football) players
Isthmian League players
Footballers from Lambeth
Black British sportsmen